The 1930–31 Montreal Canadiens season was the team's 22nd season. The Montreal Canadiens defeated the Chicago Black Hawks three games to two in a best-of-five Stanley Cup final for their second consecutive Cup win and fourth in team history.

Regular season
Howie Morenz led the league in scoring.

Final standings

Record vs. opponents

Schedule and results

Playoffs
The Canadiens, by placing first, received a bye to the semi-finals where they met the Boston Bruins, who had won the American Division. The Canadiens took the best-of-five series three games to two to advance to the final.

Finals

Montreal Canadiens vs. Chicago Black Hawks

Montreal wins best-of-five series 3–2.

Player statistics

Regular season
Scoring

Goaltending

Playoffs
Scoring

Goaltending

Awards and records
 O'Brien Cup – winner of Canadian division

Transactions

See also
1930–31 NHL season

References

Montreal Canadiens seasons
Montreal Canadiens
Montreal Canadiens
Stanley Cup championship seasons